Lin-Manuel Miranda is an American playwright, composer, filmmaker and performer. 

He is known for creating the Broadway musicals Hamilton (2015) and In the Heights (2005) as well as his work on the films Moana (2016), Encanto (2021) and Tick, Tick... Boom! (2021). Among his numerous accolades, Miranda has won a Pulitzer Prize, five Grammys, three Tony Awards, two Emmys, and two Olivier Awards and has been nominated for two Academy Awards. In 2015, he was the recipient of a Genius Grant from the MacArthur Fellows Program. 

In 2016, Time magazine included Miranda in its annual Time 100 as one of the "Most Influential People in the World" and he received a star on the Puerto Rico Walk of Fame. Miranda received a star on the Hollywood Walk of Fame on November 30, 2018. In December 2018, he received the  Kennedy Center Honors for creating Hamilton.

Accolades

Awards and nominations

Special honours

Notes

References

Miranda, Lin-Manuel
Awards